{{DISPLAYTITLE:C12H17NO}}
The molecular formula C12H17NO may refer to:

 DEET
 3,4-Dimethylmethcathinone
 N-Ethylbuphedrone
 4-Ethylmethcathinone
 G-130
 IBF5MAP
 Indanorex
 5-MAPDB
 6-MAPDB
 4-Methylbuphedrone
 4-Methylethcathinone
 Pentedrone
 Phendimetrazine
 2-Phenyl-3,6-dimethylmorpholine